Chapeltown is a large village and suburb of Sheffield in  South Yorkshire, England.  It is part of the Parish of Ecclesfield. It is historically within the West Riding of Yorkshire.

Geography 

Chapeltown railway station is served by the Penistone Line and Hallam Line. Two junctions of the M1 motorway also serve the area. The A6135 road passes through the town from north to south and is joined near the town centre by the A629 road from the south-east and the B6546 road from the west.

Like much of Sheffield, there is a large amount of greenspace in and around Chapeltown. The town centre has a cricket ground and a wooded park on either side of it. Between Chapeltown and Ecclesfield the land is used for residential purposes on one side of the main road and agricultural on the other. There is also a brownfield site above the park.

History
Until industrial expansion, Chapeltown was a hamlet that originated at the intersection of the roads between Sheffield and Barnsley and between Rotherham and Wortley.  In the late 16th century a blast furnace was installed there which initially used charcoal, and from 1780 was fired with coke. Chapeltown was part of the ecclesiastical parish of Ecclesfield and had a population of 4063 persons around 1870. Coal mining was one of the main occupations of the inhabitants.

The works of Newton, Chambers & Company were first established in Chapeltown in 1793. Initially they were an iron works specialising in cast iron products, but over time  the company expanded into related mining industries and products from the fractional distillation of coal, including the Izal disinfectant range. In the Second World War they produced Churchill tanks. The company's site is now Thorncliffe Industrial Estate, where most of the industry in Chapeltown is located.

References

Bibliography

External links

 Sources for the history of Chapeltown and High Green Libraries, Archives and Information, Sheffield City Council, 2013 (PDF)

Suburbs of Sheffield